Ancistrus gymnorhynchus is a species of catfish in the family Loricariidae. It is a freshwater species native to South America, where it occurs in the upper Pao River basin in the Orinoco drainage, as well as in coastal rivers of the states of Carabobo and Yaracuy in Venezuela. The species reaches 14.2 cm (5.6 inches) SL and it is known to feed on algae, which it has been noted to be very efficient at removing.

References 

Fauna of South America
Fish described in 1854
gymnorhynchus